Athletics competitions at the 1969 South Pacific Games were held in Port Moresby, Papua and New Guinea, between August 14–20, 1969.
Following the event, a "Congress of the delegates of Member Countries of the Australasian Area" was held on August 21, 1969, resulting in the foundation of the Oceania Athletics Association.
A total of 34 events were contested, 22 by men and 12 by women.

Medal summary
Medal winners and their results were published on the Athletics Weekly webpage
courtesy of Tony Isaacs and Børre Lilloe, and on the Oceania Athletics Association webpage by Bob Snow.

Complete results can also be found on the Oceania Athletics Association webpage.

Men

Women

Medal table (unofficial)

Participation (unofficial)
Athletes from 12 countries were reported to participate:

 
 British Solomon Islands
 
 
 
 
 

 Papua and New Guinea

Notes

References

External links
Pacific Games Council
Oceania Athletics Association

Athletics at the Pacific Games
Athletics in Papua New Guinea
South Pacific Games
1969 in Papua New Guinean sport
1969 Pacific Games